Louis Mohr Block is a historic commercial building located in downtown Fort Wayne, Indiana. It was built in 1891, and is a two-story, five bay, Richardsonian Romanesque style brick building with a three-story rear addition erected in 1926. The front facade features cut limestone cladding on the upper part and round arch windows. The building was remodeled in 1963. For many years the building housed a women's clothing store, The Vogue.

It was listed on the National Register of Historic Places in 1988.

References

Commercial buildings on the National Register of Historic Places in Indiana
Commercial buildings completed in 1891
Richardsonian Romanesque architecture in Indiana
Buildings and structures in Fort Wayne, Indiana
National Register of Historic Places in Fort Wayne, Indiana